Cosmas was Bishop of Aphrodisia and martyr. Born at Palermo, on the island of Sicily, and was appointed and ordained Bishop of Aphrodisia, ordained by Pope Eugene III. When the Saracens invaded the island and captured his see, Cosmas was seized and suffered martyrdom.

Notes

Italian Roman Catholic saints
12th-century Christian saints
1160 deaths
12th-century Italian Roman Catholic bishops
Clergy from Palermo
Year of birth unknown